José Luis Encinas (born 1966 in Palencia, Spain) is a guitarist. But his family settled in the Spanish Salamanca.

He began playing the guitar at age 13.  In 1997 he released his debut album titled Duende, this album was a gold record in Spain, and was published in the United States by the label Narada Records.  Over 100,000 copies of the record were sold.

Discography

Studio albums

 Duende (1997)
 Aurora (1999)
 Remolino (2000)
 Guitarra Romántica (2001)
 Travesura (2003)
 Guitarras en Shanghai (2004)
 La Herida Lenta (2006)
 Guitarras y Lobos (2010); CD and DVD
El lenguaje de los árboles (2019)

Other compilation appearances
 Gypsy Soul: New Flamenco (1998) (Narada)
 Obsession: New Flamenco Romance (1999) (Narada)
 Global Transmissions (2000) (Narada)
 Gypsy Fire (2000) (Narada)
 Tabu: Mondo Flamenco (2001) (Narada)
 Best of Narada New Flamenco Guitar (2003) (Narada)
 Barcelona: Music Celebrating the Flavors of the World (2004) (Williams Sonoma)
 The World of the Spanish Guitar Vol. 1 (2011) (Higher Octave Music)

See also
New Flamenco
Flamenco rumba

External links
 José Luis Encinas | Official Website
 José Luis Encinas on Last.fm
 
 José Luis Encinas on Amazon
 Narada

Spanish guitarists
Spanish flamenco guitarists
Spanish male guitarists
Living people
1966 births